Ingeborg Rönnblad, born Hansson 10 April 1873 in Gränna - 2 June 1915 in Blidö was a Swedish actress. She was married to actor Hugo Rönnblad. Her parents were Julius Scheike Hansson and Jakobina Lund who ran a theater society. She worked and was employed at Södra Teatern between 1888 and 1892, at Vasateatern between 1892 and 1894, at Fröberg Teatern between 1894 and 1895 and at Ranft Teatern. Rönnblad was the aunt of actor Jules Sylvain.

Rönnblad is buried at Norrmalms begravningsplatsen in Stockholm.

References 

Swedish actresses
1873 births
1915 deaths